Ida Sunniva Sandaas Skjelbakken (born October 23, 1979) is a Norwegian author and illustrator. She was born in Lørenskog and grew up in Tangen in Stange, Hedmark. Her first novel series, Krøniken om Ylva Alm was published in July 2012 by Schibsted Forlag and ended with 25 books in 2016. In 2014 her book Fangen på celle nr. 17, based on letters she wrote from prison, was published by Schibsted Forlag, and as a second edition by Bladkompaniet in 2016. In 2018 her still ongoing novel series Nattergalen was published by Bladkompaniet.  
She has studied art in Villa Faraldi, Italy, and now makes book cover illustrations, editorial artwork, and illustrations for weekly magazines. She is also a certified bodyguard, and has been an uchi-deshi Karate student in Okinawa, Japan.

She has lived in Eskilstuna in Sweden, Ratzeburg in Germany, The Dominican Republic, Cambridge in the United Kingdom, Szakadát in Hungary, and in Naples, Italy, where she worked for a private investigator agency. She moved to Miami in the United States in 2005. In August 2011, she was arrested on firearms charges and for having a double identity. She was eventually deported from the United States upon her release from prison in 2012. She is married to illustrator Kjetil Nystuen and currently lives in Agropoli, Italy with their daughter.

References

Living people
20th-century Norwegian novelists
21st-century Norwegian novelists
Norwegian women novelists
Norwegian illustrators
Norwegian women illustrators
1979 births
People from Stange
People from Lørenskog